Shiu Ka-chun (born 1970) is a Hong Kong social worker and activist, and a former lecturer at Hong Kong Baptist University. He was one of leaders in the 2014 Hong Kong protests. In 2016, he was elected to the Legislative Council of Hong Kong through the Social Welfare functional constituency. Shiu resigned along with 14 other remaining pro-democracy legislators from the Legislative Council on 11 November 2020, after the central government had unseated four of pro-democracy legislators the same day.

Biography
Shiu is a social worker and activist, and a former lecturer and associate director of the Centre for Youth Research and Practice at Hong Kong Baptist University. 

He participated in social movements and some illegal protests, including in the 2014 Hong Kong protests, a 79-day-long protest against the Beijing government's restrictions on the electoral method of choosing the Chief Executive of Hong Kong. He was one of the core members, along with the Occupy Central trio, Benny Tai, Chan Kin-man and Chu Yiu-ming. He voluntarily reported to police after the trio and Cardinal Joseph Zen had done the same, towards the end of the Occupy event in early December 2014.

In 2016, he was elected to the Legislative Council of Hong Kong through the Social Welfare functional constituency. 

On 24 April 2019, Shiu was sentenced to eight months in prison after having been convicted, two weeks earlier, of public nuisance charges in relation to the protests in2014. The following day, Shiu was taken to hospital due to an irregular heartbeat. Having recovered from a successful angioplasty procedure, Shiu was transferred to prison by 7 May; his application for leave of absence to attend Legislative Council meetings was refused by prison authorities. After his release, Shiu was advised by Hong Kong Baptist University in late July 2020 that his contract as lecturer would not be renewed beyond August. Pointing to his excellent evaluations in teaching by students and the department head, Shiu said that the decision had "totally been a matter of political persecution".

On 11 November 2020, Shiu resigned from the Legislative Council together with 14 remaining pro-democratic legislators in protest over the unseating of four pro-democratic legislators through a ruling by the central government on the same day.

References

1970 births
Living people
Hong Kong social workers
Members of the Election Committee of Hong Kong, 2012–2017
HK LegCo Members 2016–2021
Alumni of Hong Kong Baptist University
Hong Kong political prisoners